The Nine Rings of Wu-Tang is a 1999 comic book based on the hip hop group the Wu-Tang Clan. The Wu-Tang Clan members are re-imagined as Spanish based mystic martial artists who save the world.

References

1999 comics debuts
Comics based on musical groups
Cultural depictions of hip hop musicians
Image Comics titles
Martial arts comics